Orla  (Podlachian: Vôrla,  Virlia) is a village in Bielsk County, Podlaskie Voivodeship, in north-eastern Poland. It is the seat of the gmina (administrative district) called Gmina Orla.

According to the 1921 census, the village was inhabited by 1.518 people, among whom 31 were Roman Catholic, 320 Orthodox, and 1.167 Mosaic. At the same time, 400 inhabitants declared Polish nationality, 145 Belarusian and 1.167 Jewish. There were 253 residential buildings in the village.

The village has a population of 1,100. It is in one of five Polish/Belarusian bilingual Gmina in Podlaskie Voivodeship regulated by the Act of 6 January 2005 on National and Ethnic Minorities and on the Regional Languages, which permits certain gminas with significant linguistic minorities to introduce a second, auxiliary language to be used in official contexts alongside Polish.

References

Villages in Bielsk County
Podlachian Voivodeship
Belsky Uyezd (Grodno Governorate)
Białystok Voivodeship (1919–1939)
Belastok Region